Memory Run, also known as Synapse, is a 1995 action film set in the year 2015, starring Karen Duffy. It is based on the novel Season of the Witch (1968), published by Jean Marie Stine under her former name Hank Stine.

Plot 
The year is 2015 and Big Brother is everywhere. The search for immortality is over. Science has finally achieved the impossible, undermining that most basic aspect of life:  Mind, Body and Soul must be united.  Those who benefit from this new technology will wake up to a new and youthful beginning - the rest of humankind must live a bad dream and wake up to a living nightmare that goes beyond life, beyond death, and beyond redemption.

References

External links

1995 films
American science fiction action films
1990s science fiction action films
Films set in 2015
Films set in the future
Films directed by Allan A. Goldstein
American dystopian films
Films with screenplays by Allan A. Goldstein
1990s English-language films
1990s American films